Wes Samuel O'Neill (born March 3, 1986 in Windsor, Ontario) is a Canadian former professional ice hockey defenseman who previously played with the Colorado Avalanche organization of the National Hockey League.

Playing career
O'Neill was drafted 115th overall in the 2004 NHL Entry Draft by the New York Islanders. Originally from the Green Bay Gamblers of the USHL he was to play for Canada at the World U18 Championships in 2004. He then committed to play four years of collegiate hockey at Notre Dame culminating in a conference championship in 2007.

O'Neill signed as a free agent by the Colorado Avalanche on August 20, 2007. He made his professional debut in the 2007–08 season with the Avalanche's affiliate, the Lake Erie Monsters. O'Neill spent the majority of the year with the Monsters before he was sent to the Johnstown Chiefs of the ECHL for their playoff run.

In the 2008–09 season, O'Neill received his first NHL recall on March 27, 2009. He made his NHL debut with the Avalanche on the same day, in a 4-1 defeat to the Vancouver Canucks.  He was sent back down to the Lake Erie Monsters on April 4, 2009. 

Wes was assigned to Lake Erie and recorded a career-high 15 points in the 2009–10 season. Wes became the Monsters franchise leader in games played with 159 and appeared in a further two games for the Avalanche in a brief stint in January.

O'Neill was not retained by the Avalanche and was rendered a free agent at season's end. Unable to attract an NHL offer prior to the 2010–11 season, O'Neill accepted a try-out to the reigning AHL Champions, the Hershey Bears, training camp but failed to attain a contract. With the season underway, Wes signed with Kalamazoo Wings of the ECHL on a one-year contract on October 18, 2010. As Captain of the K-Wings, O'Neill appeared in 13 games before he was signed on a professional try-out contract by AHL affiliate, the Bridgeport Sound Tigers, on November 19, 2010.

After a second injury hit season with the Wings, O'Neill left as a free agent and signed a one-year contract with ECHL competitor the Toledo Walleye on September 4, 2012. At the conclusion of the 2012-13 season, O'Neill opted to retire from hockey after 6 professional seasons.

Career statistics

Regular season and playoffs

International

Awards and honours

References

External links
 

1986 births
Bridgeport Sound Tigers players
Colorado Avalanche players
Houston Aeros (1994–2013) players
Ice hockey people from Ontario
Johnstown Chiefs players
Kalamazoo Wings (ECHL) players
Lake Erie Monsters players
Living people
New York Islanders draft picks
Notre Dame Fighting Irish men's ice hockey players
Providence Bruins players
Sportspeople from Windsor, Ontario
Toledo Walleye players
Canadian ice hockey defencemen